Caprile is a comune (municipality) in the Province of Biella in the Italian region Piedmont, located about  northeast of Turin and about  northeast of Biella.

Caprile borders the following municipalities: Ailoche, Coggiola, Crevacuore, Guardabosone, Portula, Postua, Pray, Scopello, Trivero.

Demographic evolution

References

Cities and towns in Piedmont